The Otter Light Reconnaissance Car (known officially by the British as Car, Light Reconnaissance, Canadian GM (R.A.C.) was a light armoured car produced in Canada during the Second World War for British and Commonwealth forces.

History
The Otter Light Reconnaissance Car (LRC) was developed by General Motors Canada to meet the demand for this type of armoured car. The design followed the layout of the British Humber Mark III LRC.

Design
The Otter was based on the Chevrolet C15 Canadian Military Pattern truck chassis and used many standard GM components. It took a crew of three - driver and commander seated in the vehicle front, while the gunner occupied the turret position at the rear.  A Wireless Set No. 19 was mounted in the rear with A and B set aerials extending from the rear of the fighting compartment on mounting arms. 

The primary armament consisted of a hull-mounted Boys anti-tank rifle and a Bren light machine gun in a small open-topped turret. A smoke discharger is mounted alongside the mounting for the Boys anti-tank rifle.  

Although it used a more powerful engine than the Humber, it was larger and heavier (by a ton); overall performance was less than that of the Humber, but still acceptable.

Production
Between 1942 and 1945, 1761 units were produced in Oshawa, Ontario, though fewer than 1,000 were delivered overseas.

Usage
The Otter served with Canadian units in the Italian Campaign and Northwest European operations.
It was also employed by the South African Army and the British RAF Regiment. Some RAF regiment vehicles used aircraft armament such as 20mm cannon and 0.303 Browning machine guns.
After the war the Otter was used by the Jordanian Army and Dutch Army during the Indonesian Revolution. Syrian Army also operated the type after the war, with turretless Otter armed with 7.5 mm FM 24/29 light machine gun in pintle mounts or with 37 mm Puteaux SA 18 in a turret taken from other British-build armoured car.

Variants
 Car, Light Reconnaissance, Canadian, G.M. Mark 1(R.A.C.) with turret.
 Car, Light Reconnaissance, Canadian, G.M. Mark 2 (R.A.C.) without turret.

Surviving vehicles
The Karl Smith Collection in Tooele, Utah.
The RAF Regiment Museum, Honington.
Hellenic Historical Vehicles Preservation Club, Greece,
Fort Nieuw Amsterdam Open Air Museum, Surinam.

Gallery

See also
C15TA Armoured Truck
Canadian Military Pattern truck

References
Notes

Bibliography
White, BT AFV Profile No. 30 ''Armoured Cars - Marmon-Herrington, Alvis-Straussler, Light Reconnaissance (1971) Profile Publishing
Roger V.Lucy, ""The Otter Light Reconnaissance Car in Canadian Service", Service Publications,Ottawa, 2012

External links
Battlefront.co.nz
Photo gallery at Tanxheaven.com
Haugh, D Otter datasheet

World War II armoured cars
World War II armoured fighting vehicles of Canada
Reconnaissance vehicles of World War II
Military vehicles introduced from 1940 to 1944